Lake Cities was the name of two different passenger trains:
Lake Cities (train), operated by the Erie Railroad and its successors 1947-1970
Lake Cities (Amtrak train), operated by Amtrak 1980-2004